Monster Games, Inc. is an American independent video game developer in Northfield, Minnesota, United States that specializes in racing games and ports in action, platforms and action role-playing games. The company was founded in 1996, and was acquired by iRacing.com Motorsport Simulations in 2022.

Games developed

References

External links
 

Video game companies of the United States
Video game development companies
Companies based in Minnesota
American companies established in 1996
Video game companies established in 1996
Northfield, Minnesota
1996 establishments in Minnesota
2022 mergers and acquisitions